Helm is a British or German origin surname.

Notable people with this name include

A
Amy Helm (born 1970), American singer-songwriter
Anne Helm (born 1938), Canadian actress
Anne Helm (voice actress) (born 1986), German voice actress
Anny Helm (1903–1993), Austrian soprano

B
Benjamin Helm (rower) (born 1964), British rower
Benjamin Hardin Helm (1831–1863), American politician
Bob Helm (1914–2003), American jazz clarinetist
Boone Helm (1828–1864), American traveler and cannibal
Brett Helm (born 1962), American entrepreneur
Brigitte Helm (1908–1996), German actress

C
Charles Helm (1844–1915), South African missionary
Christopher Helm (1937–2007), Scottish publisher
Clementine Helm (1825–1896), German author

D
Damariscotta Helm, American whistler
Daniel Helm (born 1995), American football player
Darren Helm (born 1987), Canadian ice hockey player
Dieter Helm (born 1956), British economist
Dieter Helm (politician) (1941–2022), German farmer and politician
Dörte Helm (1898–1941), German artist
Drew Helm (born 1984), American soccer player

E
Everett Helm (1913–1999), American composer

F
Fay Helm (1909–2003), American actress
Frances Helm (1923-2006), American actress
Franz Helm (1500–1567), German artillery master

G
Georg Helm (1851–1923), German mathematician
George Helm (1950–1977), American activist and musician
George Helm (cricketer) (1838–1898), English cricketer

H
Harvey Helm (1865–1919), American politician
Israel Helm (1630–1702), Swedish colonist

J
Jack Helm (1839–1873), American cowboy
James Meredith Helm (1855–1927), American naval officer
John Helm (disambiguation), multiple people
Joseph Helm (1848–1915), American jurist
Joshua Helm (born 1982), American basketball player
June Helm (1924–2004), American anthropologist

K
Karl Helm (1871–1960), German medievalist
Ken Helm, American politician
Knox Helm (1893–1964), British diplomat

L
Leonard Helm (1720–1782), American soldier
Levon Helm (1940–2012), American rock drummer
Lorin Helm (1920–1945), American football coach
Lucinda Barbour Helm (1839–1897), American author

M
MacKinley Helm (1896–1963), American writer and collector
Mark Helm (disambiguation), multiple people
Mathew Helm (born 1980), Australian diver
Michael Helm (born 1961), Canadian novelist

N
Nellie Lathrop Helm (1859–1940), American author
Nick Helm (born 1980), British comedian

P
Paul Helm (born 1940), British theologian
Peyton R. Helm (born 1949), American academic administrator

R
Raiatea Helm (born 1984), American vocalist
Robert Helm (born 1949), American politician
Rüdiger Helm (born 1956), German sprint canoeist
Rudolf Helm (1872–1966), German philologist
Ryan Helm (born 1982), American musician

S
Sarah Helm (born 1956), British journalist
Sue Helm (born 1943), American politician

T
Theodor Helm (1843–1920), Austrian musicologist
Tiffany Helm (born 1964), American actress
Toby Helm, British journalist
Tom Helm (disambiguation), multiple people

W
William Helm (1837–1919), American pioneer and farmer
William Henry Helm (1860–1936), English author
W. Stuart Helm (1908–1986), American politician

Z
Zach Helm (born 1975), American writer and film director

Fictional characters
Matt Helm, fictional character in Matt Helm

See also
Senator Helm (disambiguation), a disambiguation page with Senators surnamed Helm
Helms, people with the surname Helm